Al-Mazra'a is a village in northern Syria located west of Homs in the Homs Governorate. According to the Syria Central Bureau of Statistics, al-Mazra'a had a population of 2,519 in the 2004 census. Its inhabitants are predominantly Shia Muslims and Alawites.

References

Alawite communities in Syria
Populated places in Homs District
Shia Muslim communities in Syria